Jens Köppen (born 6 January 1966 in Kyritz, East Germany) is a German rower, who competed for the SG Dynamo Potsdam / Sportvereinigung (SV) Dynamo. He won medals at international rowing competitions. He is married to the rower Kathrin Boron.

References 

East German male rowers
Olympic medalists in rowing
1966 births
Living people
World Rowing Championships medalists for East Germany
Medalists at the 1988 Summer Olympics
Olympic bronze medalists for East Germany
Olympic rowers of Germany
Olympic rowers of East Germany
Rowers at the 1988 Summer Olympics
Rowers at the 1992 Summer Olympics
People from Ostprignitz-Ruppin
Sportspeople from Brandenburg